Charles Sweetser (May 12, 1793 – July 24, 1865) was an American tobacco manufacturer and politician.

Personal life
Sweetser was the son of William Sweetser Jr., a snuff manufacturer who established the first tobacco business in the Saugus neighborhood that bore the family name - Sweetser's Corner (now known as Cliftondale). On August 6, 1815, he married Nancy Mansfield. They had five sons and five daughters. Nancy Sweetser died on October 3, 1835, at the age of 36. On March 14, 1836, he married Sally S. Bond of Lynn, Massachusetts.

Business career
In 1820, Sweetser purchased the snuff mill of Samuel Copp. Sweetser manufactured cigars as well as snuff. His products were sold across the United States and even internationally. In 1844 he purchased a chocolate mill from Amariah Childs and used it to roast and grind coffee. The mill was later taken over by Herbert B. Newhall, son of Benjamin F. Newhall. Sweetser retired in 1860 and his tobacco business was taken over by his two of his sons, Charles A. and George H. Sweetser, who ran it as Sweetser Brothers.

Politics
In 1839, Sweetser was elected to the Massachusetts House of Representatives. He was elected to a second term in 1851. He was described by E. P. Robinson as someone who was "very decided in his opinions" and who "enjoyed the confidence of the people to a large degree". He was succeeded by his son George at the end of his second term.

References

1793 births
1865 deaths
American tobacco industry executives
Members of the Massachusetts House of Representatives
People from Saugus, Massachusetts